Phellinocis is a genus of beetles in the family Ciidae, containing the following species:

 Phellinocis erwini Lopes-Andrade & Lawrence, 2005
 Phellinocis romualdoi Lopes-Andrade & Lawrence, 2005
 Phellinocis thayeri Lopes-Andrade & Lawrence, 2005

References

Ciidae genera